Live at the Troubadour may refer to:

Gold: Recorded Live at the Troubadour, by Neil Diamond (1970)
In Concert at the Troubadour, 1969, by Rick Nelson (1970)
Live at the L.A. Troubadour, by Fairport Convention (1977)
House Full: Live at the L.A. Troubadour, by Fairport Convention (1986)
Live at the Troubadour 1969, by Tim Buckley (1994)
Live at the Troubadour, by Glenn Yarbrough (1994)
Live at the Troubadour (Kevin Gilbert & Thud album), (1999)
Live at the Troubadour, by Phantom Planet (2004)
Live at the Troubadour, by The Naked Trucker and T-Bones Show (2007)
Live at the Troubadour, by Hall & Oates (2008)
Live at the Troubadour (Carole King and James Taylor album), (2010)
Live at the Troubadour, by Sarah Jarosz (2013)